William Craig Campbell (born 1953) is an American politician, who served as the 57th Mayor of Atlanta, Georgia from January 1994–January 2002. He was the third African-American mayor in the city's history. Accused of corruption during his time in office, he was convicted for tax evasion in 2006 and spent 16 months in federal prison.

Early life

On September 8, 1960 Bill Campbell was enrolled in Murphey Elementary School in Raleigh, North Carolina at the age of seven, thus becoming the first black student to attend an all-white school in Raleigh City Schools. He later recalled, "My family prepared me by simply saying this. 'This is important, and you’re going to have to do it. You’re going to have to endure it'." Campbell's parents also tried to enroll Campbell's older brother, Ralph, and his older sister but he was the only one approved for entry. Campbell was accepted by his teacher and immediate classmates, but his presence upset some of the parents of other students. Some of the older students bullied him, and his parents received bomb threats. Campbell remained the only black student at Murphey for five years. He later graduated from William G. Enloe High School.

University
Campbell received a B.A. from Vanderbilt University, and a J.D. from Duke University Law School. He is a member of Omega Psi Phi.

Mayor of Atlanta
Campbell was heartily endorsed by outgoing mayor Maynard Jackson, and won the 1993 election. During his first term, his major accomplishments included overhauling the city's finance department, passing a major bond issue to pay for infrastructure improvements for the 1996 Summer Olympics, rebuilding the public housing system, and modernizing the legal, public works, and water departments. Violent crime rates also dropped significantly during his tenure. According to Douglas A. Blackmon, Campbell was seen as a "post–civil rights movement black politician who would leverage the economic rebirth of Atlanta, build a bridge to white voters, and become a U.S. senator or a Georgia governor".

Campbell subsequently fell into disfavor during his second term, despite defeating then-president of the Atlanta City Council, Marvin S. Arrington, Sr. The 1997 race was known for its emphasis on the racial overtones often not publicly seen in the African-American community, with Campbell being the lighter-skinned candidate and Arrington the darker complexioned. Campbell would later be criticized for deploying anti-Black racist messaging in an attempt to deflect criticism of his record as mayor. Campbell was succeeded by Shirley Franklin. Following his tenure as mayor, he moved to Palm Beach Gardens, Florida, where he worked as a practicing attorney. He was disbarred by order of the Supreme Court of Florida as a result of his tax evasion conviction.

Failure of Atlanta Empowerment Zone
In November 1994, the Atlanta Empowerment Zone was established, a 10-year, $250 million federal program to revitalize Atlanta's 34 poorest neighborhoods including the Bluff. Scathing reports from both the U.S. Department of Housing and Urban Development and the Georgia Department of Community Affairs revealed corruption, waste, bureaucratic incompetence, and specifically called out interference by mayor  Campbell.

Tax evasion conviction
In August 2004 Campbell retained high-profile attorney Billy Martin to defend him against several indictments by a federal grand jury on racketeering, bribery, wire fraud and tax evasion charges. The charges came from a five-year federal investigation into possible corruption during his time as Mayor of Atlanta. Campbell was later acquitted on racketeering, bribery and wire fraud charges; however, on March 10, 2006, a federal jury convicted him on three counts of tax evasion. He was sentenced by U.S. District Court Judge Richard Story to 30 months in prison for the three counts on tax evasion. He was also ordered to serve a year on probation, pay $6,000, and pay more than $60,000 in back taxes. On August 21, 2006 he reported to the Federal Correctional Institution in Miami, Florida.

Campbell was released from prison in December 2007 after receiving a shortened sentence by enrolling in a drug treatment program. This came just a short time after he told a federal judge that he was not struggling with a drug abuse problem.  It was reported by The New York Times that "Prison officials said inmates must offer documentation of prior substance abuse to enter the treatment program, but for privacy reasons they said they could not disclose whether Mr. Campbell submitted such proof." Campbell's statements to the judge weren't used to determine whether or not he could enter the program.

References

Works cited 
  - Read online

External links

 U.S. Attorney's Press Release RE: Indictment
 Ten page indictment summary
 U.S. Attorney's Press Release RE: Conviction
 U.S. Attorney's Press Release RE: Sentence

1953 births
Living people
Politicians from Raleigh, North Carolina
Mayors of Atlanta
Duke University School of Law alumni
Vanderbilt University alumni
American people convicted of tax crimes
African-American mayors in Georgia (U.S. state)
William G. Enloe High School alumni
African-American history in Raleigh, North Carolina
Bill